OpenPlay is the name of an open-source cross-platform networking library created by Apple Inc. OpenPlay compiles and runs on the Classic Mac OS, macOS, Windows and Linux operating systems. OpenPlay is a high-level networking solution for game applications. It is known for its abstraction of game and player on top of an automatically managed networking core.

As of version 2.0, it includes the NetSprockets API from Mac OS 9. NetSprockets, a subset of Apple's now obsolete Game Sprockets, was created by Apple and Bungie. NetSprockets was ported to OpenPlay by Freeverse Software .

See also 
 Grapple (network layer)
 RakNet

References

External links
OpenPlay project page on SourceForge
OpenPlay project page on GitHub

Application programming interfaces
Linux APIs
macOS APIs
Software using the Apple Public Source License
Video game engines
Windows APIs